Statistics of Austrian Football Bundesliga in the 1992–93 season.

Overview
Fall season was contested by 12 teams, and higher eight teams go into Meister playoff. Lower four teams fought in Mittlere Playoff with higher four teams of Austrian Football First League.

FK Austria Wien won the championship.

Teams and location

Teams of 1992–93 Austrian Football Bundesliga
FC Admira/Wacker
Austria Salzburg
Austria Wien
LASK
VfB Mödling
Rapid Wien
Sankt Pölten
Stahl Linz
Sturm Graz
Vorwärts Steyr
Wiener Sport-Club
Wacker Innsbruck

Autumn season

Table

Results

Spring season

Championship playoff

Table

Results

Promotion/relegation playoff

Table

Results

References
Austria - List of final tables (RSSSF)

Austrian Football Bundesliga seasons
Aust
1992–93 in Austrian football